Woonton is a hamlet which forms part of the parish of Almeley in Herefordshire, England. It is on the A480 road and is near the town of Kington.

Villages in Herefordshire